A floor is the bottom surface of a room or vehicle.

Floor may also refer to:

Buildings
 Floor (gymnastics), a specially prepared exercise surface
 Floor (legislative), the place where members of a legislature sit and make speeches
 Flooring, a permanent covering of a floor, or the work of installing such
 Storey, a level of a building

Music
 Floor (band), a metal band from Florida
 Floor (album), an album by the above-mentioned band
 The Floor, also known as The Hitmakers, a Danish rock band
 Floored 1997 album by American rock band Sugar Ray
 "FLOOR", a song by P-MODEL from the album Another Game

People
 Kim Floor (born 1948), Finnish representative in the 1972 Eurovision Song Contest
 Willem Floor (born 1942), Dutch historian, linguist, and writer
 Kabamba Floors (born 1980), a South African rugby union footballer
 Floor de Zeeuw (1898–1979), Dutch footballer and football coach
 Floor Jansen (born 1981), a female symphonic metal singer
 Floor van den Brandt (born 1990), Dutch speed skater

Mathematics, science and engineering
 Floor function, a mathematical function that gives the greatest integer less than the input value
 Floor (valley), the bottom of a valley
 Ocean floor, the bottom of the ocean

Other uses
 Floors Castle, Scotland
 Floor exercise, gymnastics routines with no equipment
 Floored (film), a documentary about the Chicago trading floors
 Shop floor in retail or factory premises, where people work with machines or clients

See also
 
 
 Flor (disambiguation)
 4th floor (disambiguation)
 Flour (disambiguation)
 Floortje, a given name, including notable people with the name
 Performance surface, flooring for dance or sport